Masdar,(Arabic:مصدر‎), also known as the Abu Dhabi Future Energy Company, is a UAE-government owned renewable energy company based in Abu Dhabi, United Arab Emirates.

History
In 2006, the UAE government established Abu Dhabi Future Energy Company PJSC (Masdar) to diversify the energy resources and boost the local economy. 

Masdar has invested in one of the world’s largest concentrated solar plant Shams 1, and offshore wind farms the London Array. Masdar continues to support renewable energy, climate action, and domestic and international sustainability through various initiatives it has taken locally and internationally.  

Ahmed Al Jaber is the chairman of Masdar, as well as a member of the UAE Federal Cabinet. Al Jaber’s history with Masdar began in 2006, when he was appointed as the founding CEO. In 2009, he oversaw Masdar’s efforts to secure the presence of the International Renewable Energy Agency (IRENA) headquarters at Masdar City, delivering the successful bid in South Korea.

Projects
Masdar Renewables is involved in renewable energy projects. Masdar Renewables follows the Dubai Clean Energy Strategy 2050. Its projects include the Shams Initiative, Dubai’s rooftop solar initiative, the Mohammed bin Rashid Al Maktoum Solar Park in Dubai, The Smart Dubai Initiative, and the Al Dhafra Solar PV Independent Power Producer (IPP) in Abu Dhabi that aims to be the world's largest solar power plant. The company has also invested in wind power projects, and waste-to-energy/landfill plants.

Masdar has a presence in 40 different countries and has invested over US$30 billion in solar and wind projects. In November 2022, it signed a preliminary agreement to develop renewable energy projects in Jordan.

In 2013, Masdar partnered with the government of Seychelles to develop a 6 MW wind farm for Mahé Island. and started building a hybrid photovoltaic and natural gas concentrated solar power (CSP) plant in Al Ain called Noor 1, and a 30 MW wind farm on Sir Bani Yas island.

Masdar holds 20% equity in the London Array, a large wind farm off the coast of Britain designed to generate up to 1,000 MW of power. Masdar invested in the 20 MW Gemasolar Thermosolar Plant and the twin 50 MW Valle 1 and Valle 2 solar power stations in Spain, which were developed by Torresol Energy, a joint venture between SENER and Masdar with respective equity stakes of 60% and 40%.

Masdar aims to lead the global green hydrogen initiative and has partnered with energy companies, airlines and universities   with the goal of producing up to 1 million tonnes of green hydrogen per annum by 2030.  

Masdar hosts Abu Dhabi Sustainability Week, with a series of events focused on accelerating sustainable development. It gathers together policymakers, industry specialists, technology pioneers and sustainability leaders.

Masdar City

Masdar City is a sustainable urban development project that was launched by the Abu Dhabi future energy company Masdar in 2008, located in Abu Dhabi in the United Arab Emirates, and was designed to be a zero-carbon city by 2016. The city is powered in part by the Masdar City 10MW Solar Power Plant, the first grid-connected renewable energy project in the UAE and the largest of its kind in the Middle East when inaugurated in 2009. An additional 1MW of rooftop PV is located on the buildings developed as phase 1 of Masdar City.

Masdar City has a university for artificial intelligence (AI), which was launched 2019. The Mohamed bin Zayed University of Artificial Intelligence (MBZUAI) is a graduate-level research institution, named after Sheikh Mohamed bin Zayed.

In December 2022 it was announced that the Abu Dhabi National Energy Company PJSC (TAQA), Mubadala Investment Company (Mubadala) and Abu Dhabi National Oil Company (ADNOC) would partner under the Abu Dhabi Future Energy Company (Masdar) brand to form a global clean energy powerhouse focused on renewable energy and green hydrogen . As per the new shareholder structure, Masdar City would be under Mubadala’s ownership.

References

External links

Energy companies of the United Arab Emirates
Renewable energy companies of Asia
Renewable energy in the United Arab Emirates
Companies based in Abu Dhabi
Energy companies established in 2006
Renewable resource companies established in 2006
Emirati companies established in 2006